Sidney Cornell (26 December 1914- 24 March 1945) was a British paratrooper serving during World War II.

In popular culture
The 2021 video game Call of Duty: Vanguard features a character based on Cornell named Arthur Kingsley.

References

External links
https://www.pegasusarchive.org/normandy/sidney_cornell.htm
https://www.liberationroute.com/it/stories/199/sidney-cornell
https://www.portsmouth.co.uk/news/defence/untold-story-first-black-paratrooper-land-d-day-who-was-portsmouth-will-be-revealed-new-film-987293

1914 births
1945 deaths
British Army personnel killed in World War II
Paratroopers
Black British military personnel